The Melinda E. Morgan House is a house located in northwest Portland, Oregon, that is listed on the National Register of Historic Places.

See also
 National Register of Historic Places listings in Northwest Portland, Oregon

References

Houses on the National Register of Historic Places in Portland, Oregon
Queen Anne architecture in Oregon
Colonial Revival architecture in Oregon
Houses completed in 1893
1893 establishments in Oregon
Northwest Portland, Oregon
Portland Historic Landmarks